Bianchin is an Italian surname. Notable people with the surname include:

Helen Bianchin (born 1939), Australian writer
Luca Bianchin (born 1971), Italian swimmer
Thomas Bianchin (born 1987), French rugby union player
Wayne Bianchin (born 1953), Canadian-Italian ice hockey player

Italian-language surnames